Elpis FC (Greek:Ελπίς, meaning Hope), is a defunct sports club of Istanbul, Ottoman Empire.

History 
Elpis FC was founded in 1904 in Kadıköy district of Istanbul by the local Greeks and the team was completely made up by Greek footballers. The football club was dissolved in 1912.

Matches
20 March 1910 Fenerbahçe SK – Elpis FC: 1–1

League tables

Istanbul Football League:

1904–05 Istanbul Football League: 1) HMS Imogene FC 2) Moda FC 3) Cadi-Keuy FC 4) Elpis FC

1905–06 Istanbul Football League: 1) Cadi-Keuy FC 2) HMS Imogene FC 3) Moda FC 4) Elpis FC

1906–07 Istanbul Football League: 1) Cadi-Keuy FC 2) Moda FC 3) HMS Imogene FC 4) Galatasaray SK 5) Elpis FC

1907–08 Istanbul Football League: 1) Moda FC 2) Cadi-Keuy FC 3) Galatasaray SK 4) Elpis FC 5) HMS Imogene FC

See also
List of Turkish Sports Clubs by Foundation Dates

References
 Dağlaroğlu, Rüştü. Fenerbahçe Spor Kulübü Tarihi 1907–1957
 Elpis Futbol Kulübü. Türk Futbol Tarihi vol.1. page(22). (June 1992) Türkiye Futbol Federasyonu Yayınları.
 Atabeyoğlu, Cem. 1453–1991 Türk Spor Tarihi Ansiklopedisi. page(65).(1991) An Grafik Basın Sanayi ve Ticaret AŞ

Defunct football clubs in Turkey
Association football clubs established in 1904
Association football clubs disestablished in 1910
Sport in Istanbul
1904 establishments in the Ottoman Empire
1910 disestablishments in the Ottoman Empire

Greek football clubs in the Ottoman Empire
Greeks in Turkey
Greek sports clubs outside Greece